is a Japanese politician of the New Komeito Party, a member of the House of Representatives in the Diet (national legislature). A native of Abu District, Yamaguchi and graduate of the Soka University, he worked at the government of Yamaguchi Prefecture from 1975 to 1992. He was elected to the House of Representatives for the first time in 1993.

References

External links 
 Official website in Japanese.

Members of the House of Representatives (Japan)
People from Yamaguchi Prefecture
Living people
1951 births
New Komeito politicians
21st-century Japanese politicians